Leon Kern (born 22 April 1997) is a German footballer who plays as a centre-forward for TSV Schott Mainz.

References

External links
 
 Leon Kern at Fupa

German footballers
Germany youth international footballers
Association football forwards
1. FSV Mainz 05 II players
3. Liga players
1997 births
Living people